Second-seeded Lesley Turner defeated fifth-seeded Ann Jones 2–6, 6–3, 7–5 in the final to win the women's singles tennis title at the 1963 French Championships.

Seeds
The seeded players are listed below. Lesley Turner is the champion; others show the round in which they were eliminated.

  Margaret Smith (quarterfinals)
  Lesley Turner (champion)
  Darlene Hard (second round)
  Jan Lehane (quarterfinals)
  Ann Jones (finalist)
  Heather Segal (fourth round)
  Renée Schuurman (third round)
  Vera Suková (semifinals)
  Françoise Dürr (fourth round)
  Jill Blackman (quarterfinals)
  Christine Truman (semifinals)
  Mary Habicht (fourth round)
  Liz Starkie (third round)
  Robyn Ebbern (quarterfinals)
  Rita Bentley (third round)
  Silvana Lazzarino (second round)

Draw

Key
 Q = Qualifier
 WC = Wild card
 LL = Lucky loser
 r = Retired

Finals

Earlier rounds

Section 1

Section 2

Section 3

Section 4

Section 5

Section 6

Section 7

Section 8

References

External links
   on the French Open website

1963 in women's tennis
1963
1963 in French women's sport
1963 in French tennis